Tyree Gillespie (born September 5, 1998) is an American football safety for the Jacksonville Jaguars of the National Football League (NFL). He played college football at Missouri and was drafted by the Las Vegas Raiders in the fourth round of the 2021 NFL Draft.

Early life and high school
Gillespie grew up in Ocala, Florida and attended Vanguard High School. He played safety and running back and returned punts for the Knights. As a senior, Gillespie had 40 tackles and two interceptions on defense and rushed for 555 yards and seven touchdowns with a 14.2 rushing averaged on offense. He committed to play college football at Missouri over offers from Iowa State, Marshall, New Mexico and Troy.

College career
Gillespie played for the Missouri Tigers for four seasons. As a freshman, he played in seven games. He started the final eight games of his sophomore season and finished with 48 tackles. As a junior, Gillespie recorded 50 tackles, 4.0 tackles for loss, and one sack with seven pass breakups a forced fumble. He had 46 total tackles and four pass breakups in nine games in his senior season. While at Missouri, Gillespie was a member of the Omega Psi Phi fraternity.

Professional career

Las Vegas Raiders
Gillespie was drafted by the Las Vegas Raiders in the fourth round, 143rd overall, of the 2021 NFL Draft. On May 17, 2021, he signed his four-year rookie contract with the Raiders. He entered his rookie season as the backup strong safety and mostly played in special teams. He was placed on injured reserve on November 17, 2021. He was activated on December 25.

Tennessee Titans
On August 16, 2022, Gillespie was traded to the Tennessee Titans for a conditional 2024 seventh-round pick. He was waived on August 30.

Jacksonville Jaguars
On August 31, 2022, Gillespie was claimed off waivers by the Jacksonville Jaguars. He was waived on December 19, and re-signed to the practice squad.

References

External links
Missouri Tigers bio

1998 births
Living people
Players of American football from Florida
American football safeties
Sportspeople from Ocala, Florida
Missouri Tigers football players
Las Vegas Raiders players
Tennessee Titans players
Jacksonville Jaguars players